Ba Htay was a Burmese businessman, administrator, the Chairman of the Multi-Party Democracy General Election Commission and one of the pioneers of the now-extinct Scouting movement in Burma.

Biography 
He was the eldest of three sons. He was born to well-known lumber merchants and builders in Sagaing, and his wife, Daw Lay Khin of Pekadoe Village in Sagaing on 1906.

Ba Htay represented the Union of Burma Boy Scouts and was elected one of the very earliest chairmen of the five-man Far East Scout Advisory Committee (FESAC), which would later become the Asia-Pacific Region, and served from 1958 to 1960.

Ba Htay started his career as a tutor at Rangoon University, for a brief period. He later became Indian Civil Service (ICS), and was referred to as ICS U Ba Htay, one of very few elite administrators in the government. He held such posts as Commissioner of Settlement and Land Records, Financial Commissioner, and Chairman of Burmah Oil Company, when the government took over 51% of the shares from the BOC.

Retirement 
After retirement in 1963, he was brought back into public life as the Multi-Party Democracy General Election Commission in 1988, after nationwide protests included demands for a free and fair election. Election was held in Burma (Myanmar) on 27 May 1990 and Aung San Suu Kyi's National League for Democracy (NLD) won by landslide.

References

Scouting pioneers
2000 deaths
Burmese civil servants
Scouting and Guiding in Myanmar
Burmah-Castrol
BP people
People from Sagaing Region
1906 births